WHCF (88.5 FM) is a radio station broadcasting a Contemporary Christian format. WHCF was the first full-time Christian radio station in Maine, and continues to broadcast today. WHCF is located on Outer Broadway in Bangor and is owned by Lighthouse Radio Network, Inc.  WHCF's sister station is WHMX. Licensed to Bangor, Maine, United States, the station serves the Northern, Central, and Downeast Maine area.

History & programming
The station went on the air on August 10, 1981, as the current WHCF,  The station has been known as playing a mix of Southern Gospel and Inspirational music, mixed in with 30-minute talk programs. In June 1989, the station helped put their sister station WHMX on the air.  The station is heard on several broadcast translators:

References

External links

Radio stations established in 1981
Moody Radio affiliate stations
HCF
HCF